Dragan Radović is the name of:
 Dragan Radović (basketball) (born 1976), Montenegrin basketball coach and former player
 Dragan Radović (born 1976), Montenegrin former footballer
 Dragan Radovich (born 1956), Yugoslavian-American former footballer